Garra sindhi is a species of cyprinid fish in the genus Garra endemic to the Wadi Andhur in Oman.

References 

Garra
Fish described in 2016